Kacy Milan Butterfield (born 24 January 1998) is a Bermudian professional footballer who last played for National League side Chesterfield. Butterfield also plays for the Bermuda national football team.

A youth product of the Bermudian club Robin Hood, Butterfield signed a 1-year contract with Walsall on 14 June 2016. He spent his stint with Walsall on loan to Leamington Spa and Rushall. Butterfield signed his first professional contract on 13 February 2019 with Kidderminster Harriers.

On 19 August 2020, Butterfield signed for Chesterfield from Kidderminster Harriers On 12 December 2020, he joined National League North side Guiseley on loan for a month. Butterfield returned to Chesterfield on 19 January 2021. Butterfield was released at the end of the 2020–21 season.

International career
Butterfield made his senior debut with the Bermuda national football team in a 2–2 friendly tie with Cuba on 22 February 2019.

References

External links
 
 
 Harriers Profile

1998 births
Living people
People from Hamilton, Bermuda
Bermudian footballers
Bermuda international footballers
Kidderminster Harriers F.C. players
Rushall Olympic F.C. players
Leamington F.C. players
Walsall F.C. players
Chesterfield F.C. players
Guiseley A.F.C. players
Association football midfielders
National League (English football) players
2019 CONCACAF Gold Cup players
Bermuda under-20 international footballers
Bermuda youth international footballers